The 2010 French Figure Skating Championships took place between 17 and 20 December 2009 at the Palais De La Glisse in Marseille. Skaters competed in the disciplines of men's singles, ladies' singles, pair skating, ice dancing, and synchronized skating on the senior level. The results were among the criteria used to choose the French teams to the 2010 World Championships and the 2010 European Championships.

The junior level synchronized championships were held during this competition; junior and novice level competitions for the other disciplines were held separately.

Senior results

Men

Ladies

Pairs

Ice dancing
There was no compulsory dance segment.

 WD = Withdrawn

Synchronized

Junior results

Synchronized

External links
 2010 French Championships results
 2010 French Figure Skating Championships

French Figure Skating Championships
French Figure Skating Championships, 2010
2009 in figure skating
2010 in French sport